The Sangihe lilac kingfisher (Cittura sanghirensis) is a species of kingfisher in the genus Cittura, endemic to the lowlands of the Indonesian island of Sangihe. It was previously considered a subspecies of the Sulawesi lilac kingfisher (C. cyanotis), but was split as a distinct species by the IUCN Red List and BirdLife International in 2014, and the International Ornithological Congress and Clements followed suit in 2022.

References 

Cittura
Taxa named by Richard Bowdler Sharpe
Birds described in 1868